Xorazm Stadium is a multi-use stadium in Urgench, Uzbekistan.  It is currently used mostly for football matches and is the home stadium of Xorazm FK Urganch.  The stadium holds 25,000 people.

References

Football venues in Uzbekistan